Nagykörút was a Hungarian newspaper which appeared in the 1930s, edited by the writer Jenő Rejtő. According to an internet source on playwright, journalist and pulp fiction author Jenő Rejtő edited the newspaper Nagykörút for only one edition. For how long the newspaper Nagykörút appeared in press was not mentioned, however.  

Defunct newspapers published in Hungary